Immigration Control Platform (ICP) is a political group which seeks to restrict immigration to Ireland. The organisation's website describes it as an "Irish NGO" funded by subscriptions and donations. It was not registered in Ireland as a political party, but between 2002 and 2011 it ran non-party candidates in elections, with their election material displaying the Immigration Control Platform branding.

Positions and organisation
The ICP has not applied for political party status, although it is registered as a "Third Party" by the Standards in Public Office Commission Its website describes it as a "voluntary organisation" for which:
"The aim of the organisation is to address the phenomenon of immigration to Ireland and to lobby Government for a tight immigration policy",
"The organisation aims at a very rigorous policy in relation to asylum-seekers, refugees, and a determined response to all illegal immigration", and that,
"No one who holds views of racial superiority is welcome in the group."

ICP's main activities are writing letters to newspapers, issuing press releases, and maintaining a website. It has also issued leaflets and occasionally held small protests and pickets. It has an executive committee elected by its membership at an annual meeting. It claims to be funded by membership fees and private donations. Its leaders have described it as a single-issue group. Historian Judith Pryor interprets its policy as favouring white immigrants over non-whites. ICP denies being racist.

ICP has no policy on Irish illegal immigration to the United States, an issue sometimes linked with immigration to Ireland. ICP candidate Ted Neville had himself spent time illegally in the United States.

History
ICP's most prominent member is Áine Ní Chonaill, whose official title is public relations officer. A schoolteacher from Clonakilty, she stood in Cork South-West in the 1997 general election as an independent on an anti-immigration platform, winning 0.84% of the first-preference vote. The election came early in the Celtic Tiger economic boom and an increase in asylum seekers from Eastern Europe and further afield. ICP was founded at a meeting organised by Ní Chonaill in Ennis on 13 January 1998. The meeting was disrupted by anti-racism activists, and the venues of later ICP conferences were not disclosed in advance.

In 1999 ICP did not run any candidates in that year's European Parliament elections, however the group campaigned against Proinsias De Rossa of the Labour Party, claiming it would be disastrous for Ireland if he was elected to the European Parliament because of his pro-immigrant views. De Rossa's candidacy was successful despite the ICP's efforts.

In 2002 the leader of the far-right British National Party Nick Griffin encouraged Irish voters to support Immigrant Control Platform and offered financial aid to the organisation.

Journalist Harry McGee in 2003 described Irish media coverage of ICP as disproportionate to its small size and generally hostile to its views. ICP has refused to tell the media or Oireachtas how many members it has.

In 2003 Ní Chonaill along with then-chairman John Oakes attended a discussion on immigration at the Oireachtas Joint Committee on Justice, Equality, Defence and Women's Rights. Ní Chonaill felt that a January 2003 Supreme Court decision, which permitted deportation of illegal immigrants with Irish-born children, did not go far enough. ICP supported the successful 2004 referendum which restricted citizenship by birth, a practice ICP said encouraged birth tourism by pregnant illegal immigrants.

After 2011, ICP stopped running candidates in general elections and refocused the organisation as an "NGO".

Ní Chonaill and Ted Neville of ICP spoke at the Oireachtas Committee on Justice, Defence and Equality on 1 April 2015.  During that meeting Anne Ferris was made to withdraw a comment comparing ICP's views to Nazism.

Elections

Note

General election results

See also
 Identity Ireland
 Pegida Ireland
 National Party (Ireland)

References

External links
 Official site

Anti-immigration politics in Europe
Defunct political parties in the Republic of Ireland
Eurosceptic parties in Ireland
Far-right politics in Ireland
Immigration to the Republic of Ireland
Political advocacy groups in the Republic of Ireland
Political parties disestablished in 2011
Political parties established in 1998